Ádám Juhász (born 6 June 1996) is a Hungarian handballer for S.L. Benfica and the Hungarian national team.

Career

Club
Ádám Juhász was born in Debrecen and grew up here in the Debreceni SC-SI team, then he started playing handball. After winning the age group championship in 2009 and 2011 in 2012, together with his two teammates Grundfos Tatabánya KC - Tamás Boros and Norbert Jóga. Juhász, who by then had collected several unique awards, who was the best in the Debrecen division, won the Student Olympics with his team and soon received the city's "Good Student - Good Athlete" award, soon, already in the spring of the 2012–2013 season, he was able to introduce himself to the adult team of Grundfos Tatabánya KC. He soon became one of the best and core people on the team, extending his contract with the club several times. On 2 September 2019, he suffered a cross ribbon rupture at the season opener against DVTK-Eger. Tatabánya spent 1 year with the injured Ádám Juhász.

National team
He was a team captain at the 2014 U18 European Championships, where the Hungarian team won a silver medal and Ádám Juhász was chosen as the most valuable player in the tournament. He also took part in the European U20 Championship in Denmark in 2016, but János Gyurka's team only took 10th place here. Xavi Sabaté, who manages the adults, also noticed his performance, who invited him to the Hungarian national team preparing for the European Championship qualifiers, and then he was able to present himself in an adult coat of arms on the occasion of his 24–16 victory against the Latvians. In January 2017, Sabaté also placed her in the frame called the World Championships in France, so she was able to prepare for her first adult world competition at the age of 20. He then competed in the 2018 European and 2019 World Men's Handball Championship. The rupture of the crucifix on 2 September 2019, meant he missed the 2020 European Championships.

Honours

National team
 Youth European Championship:
 : 2014

Club
Grundfos Tatabánya KC
Nemzeti Bajnokság I
: 2015, 2016, 2017, 2018, 2019, 2021
Magyar Kupa
: 2014, 2017

S.L. Benfica
 Portuguese Super Cup
: 2022

Individual
 Most Valuable Player (MVP) in the Youth European Championship: 2014
 Hungarian Youth Handballer of the Year: 2014, 2015

References

External links
Oregfiuk.hu
Tatabanyahandball.com

1996 births
Living people
Hungarian male handball players
Sportspeople from Debrecen